Nursultan Keneshbekov (born 25 March 2000) is a Kyrgyzstani long-distance runner. He competed in the 5000 metres at the 2020 Summer Olympics.

References

External links
 

Living people
2000 births
Olympic athletes of Kyrgyzstan
Kyrgyzstani male middle-distance runners
Kyrgyzstani male long-distance runners
Athletes (track and field) at the 2020 Summer Olympics
People from Issyk-Kul Region
21st-century Kyrgyzstani people